Allegheny station is a station on the Pittsburgh Regional Transit's Pittsburgh Light Rail network, located in Pittsburgh, Pennsylvania. The stop serves the North Shore neighborhood and other adjacent neighborhoods. Among the locations within walking distance are: Acrisure Stadium, the Pittsburgh Steelers football stadium; Rivers Casino; the Stage AE amphitheater; Community College of Allegheny County's Allegheny Campus; and Carnegie Science Center.

This station currently acts as the northern terminus of the Pittsburgh Light Rail system, and it is most distant station of the North Shore Connector project. It also marks the beginning of the Light Rail system's six-station "Free Fare Zone" within which riders do not need to pay to ride.

Bus bays are located under the elevated station.

Future developments

Although Allegheny station is currently a terminus, in the future, Pittsburgh Regional Transit plans to extend service westward toward Pittsburgh International Airport as well as northward into the North Hills area.

References

External links 
 
 Port Authority North Shore Connector information
 North Shore Connector Allegheny Station

Port Authority of Allegheny County stations
Railway stations in the United States opened in 2012
Blue Line (Pittsburgh)
Red Line (Pittsburgh)
Silver Line (Pittsburgh)